Lost is a 2004 American thriller film starring Dean Cain. It was written and directed by first-time filmmaker, Darren Lemke.

Plot
After orchestrating a robbery, bank Vice President Jeremy Stanton (Dean Cain) gets lost driving in the desert, en route to meeting his family with a deadline of eight hours.  He listens to tapes by a lifestyle guru (the film is divided into sections titled according to chapters from the guru's best-selling book) and seeks help from a telephone route-finding service, which gives him guidance that does not agree with his map.  At first it seems as if he has succeeded in the perfect crime, but things quickly deteriorate – he is pursued by one of his fellow robbers (Danny Trejo), a ruthless killer whom he double crossed; his wife begins to doubt the choices they've made; he attempts to turn himself in to a state trooper, who is found dead by his pursuer's hand – and self-doubt plagues him.  The film is almost a solo performance, with few other characters except Stanton and Judy (Ashley Scott), the woman from the telephone route-finder service, and tension builds in a Kafka-esque style as it becomes clear that things are not what they seem.  Ultimately, it is revealed that Judy has been paid by his pursuers to lead him into a trap.  He is surrounded and one of his pursuers taps on the window as the movie ends.

Cast
 Dean Cain as Jeremy Stanton
 Irina Björklund as Cora Stanton
 Danny Trejo as Edward James Archer
 Justin Henry as Chester Gould
 Ashley Scott as Judy
 Bill Cobbs as Jeremy's Boss
 Robert Easton as Minister

Reception
Kevin Thomas of the Los Angeles Times said in his review; "Lost is consistently clever, amusing – and scary." Jon Strickland of LA Weekly called the film a "likable thriller (that) shows surprising smarts for a low-budget debut".

References

External links
 
 
 

2004 films
2004 psychological thriller films
2000s Spanish-language films
2000s road movies
American road movies
Films with screenplays by Darren Lemke
2004 directorial debut films
American psychological thriller films
2000s English-language films
2000s American films